Havenstreet is a village on the Isle of Wight, located about 2 miles southwest of Ryde, in the civil parish of Havenstreet and Ashey.

History

The Isle of Wight Steam Railway Museum is located in Havenstreet, along with a station. Activities are run throughout the Christmas season, with a train running between Havenstreet and Wootton.

Within the grounds of Havenstreet railway station is the Haven Falconry Bird of Prey Centre.

A notable Victorian resident was Lancashire industrialist John Rylands who bought land in the village in 1882 and built a large house named Longford, after his primary residence Lancashire. The house is now used as the Northbrooke Nursing Home.

A First World War shrine, dedicated 30 June 1918, is a prominent landmark that stands on a hill north of Havenstreet village. The shrine was built in 1917 by local landowner John Willis Fleming, to honour the memory of his son, as well as all the other men of the parishes of Binstead and Havenstreet who were killed in the War.

An identical war shrine, the Stoneham War Shrine, was built at the same time at North Stoneham in Hampshire.

Public transport is provided by Southern Vectis buses, which link the village with Ryde, Newport and Wootton Bridge. They are run with volunteer drivers as part of the Community Bus Partnership.

Governance
Havenstreet is part of the electoral ward called Havenstreet, Ashey and Haylands. The population of this ward at the 2011 census was 3,613.

See also
St Peter's Church, Havenstreet

References

External links

Isle of Wight Steam Railway Museum website
Stoneham War Shrine website
The Fleming Estate in Hampshire & the Isle of Wight
CHRISTMAS DELIGHT ON THE ISLE OF WIGHT, West Coast Railway association, describing a trip of one of their members in December 2006. 
Isle of Wight Steam Railway photographs, WightCAM - photographically illustrated walks on the Isle of Wight.

Villages on the Isle of Wight